Tovik is a village in Tjeldsund Municipality in Troms og Finnmark county, Norway. Tovik's population (2001) is 151.

A characteristic feature of this village is the curved mole (or breakwater) which accommodates smaller vessels, as well as a pier for guest boats.  There is also a gas/petrol station which provides for general groceries. Tovik Church was built in 1905 to serve that part of the municipality.

References

Villages in Troms
Tjeldsund